Disma Fumagalli (born Inzago, 8 September 1826 - died Milan, 9 March 1893) was an Italian composer and teacher of music.  He was a graduate of the Milan Conservatory, where he began teaching piano in 1853.  He composed more than 300 études for piano, as well as other exercises; he also wrote a concerto for piano and string orchestra.

Fumagalli's brothers Carlo, Polibio, Adolfo, and Luca were all composers.

References
 Alfred Baumgartner: Propyläen Welt der Musik, Band 2, p. 360

1826 births
1893 deaths
19th-century Italian composers
19th-century Italian male musicians
Italian male composers
Piano pedagogues
Milan Conservatory alumni
Academic staff of Milan Conservatory
People from the Province of Milan